Caleb Tangitau (born 19 March 2003) is a New Zealand rugby sevens player.

Tangitau was named in the All Blacks Sevens squad for the 2022 Commonwealth Games in Birmingham. He won a bronze medal at the event. He competed for New Zealand at the Rugby World Cup Sevens in Cape Town. His team won a silver medal after losing to Fiji in the gold medal final.

References

External links
Caleb Tangitau at All Blacks.com

2003 births
Living people
New Zealand international rugby sevens players
Commonwealth Games rugby sevens players of New Zealand
New Zealand male rugby sevens players
Commonwealth Games medallists in rugby sevens
New Zealand rugby union players
Rugby sevens players at the 2022 Commonwealth Games
Rugby union wings
Blues (Super Rugby) players
Commonwealth Games bronze medallists for New Zealand
Medallists at the 2022 Commonwealth Games